The Dixie Flyer was a premier named passenger train that operated from 1892 to 1965 via the "Dixie Route" from Chicago and St. Louis via Evansville, Nashville, and Atlanta to Florida.  However, the train persisted to 1969 as an Atlanta to Florida operation, solely run by the Atlantic Coast Line Railroad and its successor. The Flyer's route varied in early years, but by about 1920 was set as follows:

 Chicago and Eastern Illinois (C&EI), Chicago (Dearborn Station) to Evansville (Louisville and Nashville Railroad Station), or
 Louisville and Nashville (L&N), St. Louis to Evansville section
 Louisville and Nashville, Evansville to Nashville (Nashville Union Station)
 Nashville, Chattanooga and St. Louis (NC&StL), Nashville to Atlanta (Atlanta Union Station)
 Central of Georgia (CofG), Atlanta to Albany (Albany Union Station), via Macon
 Atlantic Coast Line (ACL), Albany to Jacksonville
 Florida East Coast (FEC), Jacksonville to Miami, or
 Atlantic Coast Line, Jacksonville to Tampa and Sarasota, and Jacksonville to St. Petersburg sections

History
After the NC&StL acquired the lease of the Western and Atlantic Railroad in 1890, it began promoting its passenger business from northern connections through Tennessee, and in early 1892 christened its existing trains 1 and 2 from Nashville to Atlanta as the Dixie Flyer, with through Pullman Palace sleeping cars from Nashville to Jacksonville; these at first were routed south of Atlanta via the East Tennessee, Virginia and Georgia Railway (controlled by the Southern Railway), and later rerouted via the CofG and ACL.

In 1899, the NC&StL made an agreement with the Illinois Central (IC) to handle passengers via the IC from Chicago and from St. Louis, via Fulton, Kentucky and Martin, Tennessee on the Dixie Flyer with limited stops and a fast schedule.  In 1908, the Chicago traffic was rerouted via the CE&I from Chicago to Evansville, and the L&N from Evansville to Nashville; during World War I, the L&N also took over the traffic from St. Louis to Evansville.  Soon after the war ended, the route south of Atlanta to Jacksonville was settled on the CofG to Macon and Albany, and from there via the ACL via Tifton and Waycross.  In Jacksonville, through Pullmans were handed over to the FEC for Miami or to other ACL trains for Tampa and other west coast (Gulf of Mexico) points.

At the height of the Florida land boom in 1925, the popular Dixie Flyer was split into three sections:  the all-Pullman Dixie Flyer from Chicago/St. Louis to Florida; the coaches and Atlanta and Augusta sleepers were carried on the second section, named the Dixie Express; mail and express went by the third section, the Dixie Mail.  Following the collapse of the Florida boom and the effects of the Great Depression, services were cut back in the 1930s, with the Flyer handling both coaches and Pullmans.

A short-lived Jacksonville-Yellowstone National Park Pullman route was created in the summer of 1925, carrying a sleeper via the Dixie Flyer to St. Louis, via the Wabash to Kansas City, and via the Union Pacific to West Yellowstone.

By the postwar 1940s, the Florida East Coast Railway route along the coast was carried by the Atlantic Coast Line's Miamian. The other sections to St. Petersburg, Tampa and Sarasota were covered by ACL local trains. By the mid-1950s, the Atlantic Coast Line terminated the route at Jacksonville, including the sleeping cars. Passengers wishing to continue on the traditional Florida East Coast route to Miami would need to transfer to the ACL's East Coast Champion.

The Dixie Flyer was discontinued north of Atlanta by December 1965, From 1965 the Atlantic Coast Line RR (and then its successor, the Seaboard Coast Line Railroad) kept the train running on the route from Atlanta Union Station south to Jacksonville, on an overnight schedule, but without sleeping cars. The train was finally discontinued by December 1969. Like many other passenger trains a victim of plummeting ridership in the face of airline and highway competition.

Major stops
The following were major stops. Precise stops are in the diagram map at the right.
Chicago
St. Louis (the Chicago and St. Louis branches converged in Evansville)
Terre Haute
Evansville
Nashville
Tullahoma
Chattanooga
Dalton
Atlanta
Albany
Jacksonville
West Palm Beach
Fort Lauderdale
Miami

Separate connecting Atlantic Coast Line branches from Jacksonville served Gainesville, Orlando, Tampa, St. Petersburg, Sarasota and Ft. Myers.

Dixie Route trains
Other trains from the Midwest to Florida using the Dixie Route included:
 Dixie Flagler (streamliner)
 Dixiana
 Dixie Limited
 Dixieland
 Dixie Express
 Dixie Mail
 Southland (diverged from the Dixie Flyer route at Albany, Georgia, where it followed the Perry Cutoff to reach Tampa and St. Petersburg)

References

External links
 "Dixie Flyer," NC&StL Preservation Society, accessed 23 August 2014.  Includes photos, time tables, and newspaper accounts of the train's discontinuance.

Named passenger trains of the United States
Night trains of the United States
Passenger trains of the Chicago and Eastern Illinois Railroad
Passenger trains of the Louisville and Nashville Railroad
Passenger trains of the Nashville, Chattanooga and St. Louis Railway
Passenger trains of the Atlantic Coast Line Railroad
Passenger trains of the Florida East Coast Railway
Passenger trains of the Seaboard Coast Line Railroad
Passenger rail transportation in Florida
Passenger rail transportation in Georgia (U.S. state)
Passenger rail transportation in Illinois
Passenger rail transportation in Indiana
Passenger rail transportation in Missouri
Passenger rail transportation in Tennessee
Railway services introduced in 1892
Railway services discontinued in 1969